is the tenth episode of the Japanese anime television series Neon Genesis Evangelion, which was created by Gainax. The episode, written by Hideaki Anno and Akio Satsukawa and directed by Tsuyoshi Kaga and Kiroyuki Ishido, was first broadcast on TV Tokyo on December 6, 1995. The series is set fifteen years after a worldwide cataclysm and is mostly set in the futuristic, fortified city Tokyo-3. The series' protagonist is Shinji Ikari, a teenage boy who is recruited by his father Gendo to the special military organization Nerv to pilot a gigantic, bio-mechanical mecha named Evangelion into combat with beings called Angels. During the episode, Asuka Langley Soryu, a girl who is designated as the pilot of Evangelion Unit-02, tries to capture the eighth Angel, Sandalphon, found in the magma chamber of a Volcano in a dormant state.

The episode continues the so-called 'action arc' of the series, making room for humour and teenage tones. The basic plot of "Magmadiver" took inspiration from a documentary called Life: A Long Journey of 4 Billion Years by NHK, and critics and official material on the series found references to trilobites, The Andromeda Strain and previous works by the Gainax studio.

"Magmadiver" drew a 9.5% audience share on Japanese television, the highest for an episode of Neon Genesis Evangelion to date. It received an ambivalent or negative reception from critics, as it was considered filler and full of excessive fan service, the addition of erotic elements primarily used to please the audience. Other reviewers received the installment more positively, praising the humour, the battle against Sandalphon and Shinji's actions.

Plot
Shinji Ikari, pilot of the mecha Eva-01, and Asuka Langley Soryu, his fellow pilot deputed to command the Evangelion Unit-02, continue their cohabitation at the home of Misato Katsuragi of the special agency Nerv, deputed to the annihilation of the Angels. While their companions go on a trip to Okinawa, the two pilots remain in the city of Tokyo-3 in case of an enemy attack.

Meanwhile, Sandalphon, an Angel in a dormant state, enclosed in a chrysalis-like cocoon, is detected by the seismographic center of Mount Asama and Misato. Nerv therefore decides to undertake an action to capture the dormant Angel. To do so, Asuka and the Eva-02 are equipped with a special pressure and lava-resistant suit, the Type D equipment. Asuka therefore dives into the volcanic magma chamber and captures the Angel, who however wakes up and starts attacking the Eva-02. Asuka, exploiting the principles of thermal expansion, defeats the enemy, and Shinji with his Eva-01 rescues her before she can become trapped in the magma.

Production
In 1993, Gainax published a presentation document for Neon Genesis Evangelion entitled ; the original plan was for an episode centred on a magma fight in the eleventh episode and an episode on a Nerv blackout in the tenth one. During production, however, the episodes were reversed; what was supposed to be the eleventh episode became the tenth, while the draft on the tenth episode's blackout was used for "The Day Tokyo-3 Stood Still". "Magmadiver" was written in quatre mains by Akio Satsukawa and Hideaki Anno, director of the series, while the storyboards were edited by Anno and Tsuyoshi Kaga. Kaga worked together with Hiroyuki Ishido as director, while Shigeta Satoshi served as chief animator. Takeshi Honda designed Asuka's dress, while Seiji Kio and Mitsumu Wogi worked as assistant character designers.

The basic plot of "Magmadiver", centred on the character of Asuka and the focus of the series' 'action arc', was written with a simple structure, with a classic beginning-development-end unfolding. It has also been compared to the classic robot anime of the 1970s, in which an element presented at the beginning of an episode becomes useful as a resolution to the concluding fight. The plot was also inspired by an NHK special called Life: A Long Journey of 4 Billion Years, which aired in Japan in 1994. Life features, among others, the prehistoric animal Anomalocaris, which inspired Sandalphon's appearance.

For the fight against Sandalphon, set in Mount Asama, special water glass was used to create a distortion effect. A distorted cry of an infant was also used for the Angel's vocalizations at the start of the battle. Tomokazu Seki, Junko Iwao, Megumi Hayashibara, Tetsuya Iwanaga, voice actors of several main characters in the series, played unidentified characters for "Magmadiver". Moreover, songs from Lila  ~ from Ys, an album by Misato's voice actress Kotono Mitsuishi, were used during the episode. Yoko Takahashi also sang the final theme song of the installment, a cover of the song "Fly Me to the Moon".

Cultural references and themes

The episode contains several references to works of fiction or real existing elements, such as the biblical Magi, the film Blue Christmas and names used in diving competitions. The Boa beer that Misato drinks in the first scene refers to the Boa juice that appears in the anime movie Flying Phantom Ship (1969), while the name of the Kermadec-3 probe, used for the Angel Sandalphon investigation, comes from the volcanic Kermadec Islands in New Zealand. The Kermadec Pit also appears in an episode of Gainax's Nadia: The Secret of Blue Water. The scenes in which Misato requests the A-17 order and Shinji spots UN planes in the sky are an homage to The Andromeda Strain (1971). Moreover, the Type D equipment has been compared with the works of Kenji Yanobe, a Japanese artist popular within the otaku subculture. 

"Magmadiver", like the previous two episodes, has a light, humorous tone and a strong action component, with a predominant focus on the psychology of Asuka's character. Comic Book Resources' Devin Meenan described the installment as "the closest Evangelion gets to filler", and the battle against Sandalphon as " one of the more conventional of the series".

The episode is important for the introduction of elements regarding the scenario of the series, such as the origin of the Angels. According to a guide on the original series contained in the game Neon Genesis Evangelion RPG, the Sandalphon episode suggests dormant, larval Angels are hidden around the world. An official encyclopedia on the series links this with the biblical Book of Enoch, in which the word "Heaven", the abode of angels, actually refers to an Earthly location; because Sandalphon is discovered in the magma chamber of a volcano, Evangelion Angels exist "in the same world as ours". Sandalphon itself is inspired by prehistoric or living creatures, such as the common dab and trilobites. The mission to recover it has been interpreted by writer Dani Cavallaro as "a metaphor for pecuniary and territorial expansionism".

Reception
"Magmadiver" was first broadcast on December 6, 1995, and drew a 9.5% audience share on Japanese television, the highest for an episode of Neon Genesis Evangelion to date. Merchandise on the episode has also been released, including a line of official T-shirts. Moreover, according to the website Usgamer, a reference to the Type D equipment can be found in the Gold Saucer of the video game Final Fantasy VII.

The episode had an ambivalent reception from anime critics.  Max Covil of Film School Rejects criticised the episode for the presence of fan service, arguing that it did not live up to the previous two. The Anime Café's Akio Nagatomi described "Magmadiver" as "the Japanese equivalent of a Saturday-morning special - not bad, but not spectacular". The writers of Screen Rant ranked the confrontation against Sandalphon among the lowest on the list of best battles in the series. Jacob Parker-Dalton of Otaquest noted how the episode is hated in the fanbase, but defended it and praised the tension of the battle in the magma chamber, while the Supanova Expo website mentioned Shinji's rescue of Asuka as one of the character's best moments.

References

Citations

Bibliography

External links
 

1995 Japanese television episodes
Neon Genesis Evangelion episodes
Science fiction television episodes